Applied Physics B: Lasers & Optics is a peer-reviewed scientific journal published by Springer Science+Business Media. The editor-in-chief is Jacob Mackenzie (University of Southampton). Topical coverage includes laser physics, optical & laser materials, linear optics, nonlinear optics, quantum optics, and photonic devices. Interest also includes laser spectroscopy pertaining to atoms, molecules, and clusters. The journal publishes original research articles, invited reviews, and rapid communications.

History
The journal Applied Physics was originally conceived and founded in 1972 by Helmut K.V. Lotsch at Springer-Verlag Berlin Heidelberg New York. Lotsch edited the journal up to volume 25 and split it thereafter into the two part A26(Solids and Surfaces) and B26(Photophysics and Laser Chemistry). He continued his editorship up to the volumes A61 and B61. Starting in 1995 the two journal parts were continued under separate editorships: Applied Physics B: Photophysics and Laser Chemistry, in existence from September 1981 (volume B: 26 no. 1) to December 1993 (volume B: 57 no. 6) It partly continues Applied Physics, in existence from January 1973 (volume 1 no. 1) to August 1981 (volume 25 no. 4).

Abstracting and indexing
The journal is abstracted and indexed in:

According to the Journal Citation Reports, the journal has a 2020 impact factor of 2.070.

References

External links 
 

Hybrid open access journals
Publications established in 1981
Optics journals
Physics journals
Biweekly journals
Springer Science+Business Media academic journals
English-language journals